Mormyrus macrocephalus is a species of ray-finned fish in the family Mormyridae.

Information
The average length of Mormyrus macrocephalus is about 32 centimeters or 12 inches. Mormyrus macrocephalus is recorded to be of least concern to being an endangered species with no threat to its population to be identified, and there are not any conservation actions happening to help conserve the species.

Location
It is endemic to Uganda.  Its natural habitats are rivers and freshwater lakes. Mormyrus macrocephalus can be found in the areas of Uganda in the lakes of Kyoga and Kwania, the Victoria Nile, and the dams in the Teso district. They occupy freshwater environments.

References

Notes

Mormyrus
Endemic freshwater fish of Uganda
Taxonomy articles created by Polbot
Fish described in 1929
Taxa named by E. Barton Worthington